Jorge Contreras (born 15 October 1936) is a Chilean rower. He competed in the men's coxed pair event at the 1956 Summer Olympics.

References

External links
 

1936 births
Living people
Chilean male rowers
Olympic rowers of Chile
Rowers at the 1956 Summer Olympics
Place of birth missing (living people)
Pan American Games medalists in rowing
Pan American Games bronze medalists for Chile
Rowers at the 1959 Pan American Games
20th-century Chilean people